Chono may refer to:

Peoples and languages
 Chono people, a historic indigenous group of Chile
 Chono language, an extinct language of Chile

People with the name 
 Chono Penchev (born 1994), Bulgarian volleyball player
 Chono Ca Pe, Native American chief of the Otoe tribe
 Hisayoshi Chōno (born 1984), Japanese baseball player
 Jirō Chōno (1907–1941), Japanese fighter pilot
 Masahiro Chono (born 1963), Japanese-American professional wrestler and actor

See also 
 Chonos (disambiguation)

Language and nationality disambiguation pages